Adam Hamilton (1880–1952) was a New Zealand politician.

Adam Hamilton may also refer to:

Adam Hamilton (musician), Los Angeles based music producer, songwriter and session musician
Adam Hamilton (pastor) (born 1964), senior pastor of the United Methodist Church of the Resurrection, Leawood, Kansas

See also
Adam Hamilton Ingram, Scottish politician and MSP